The Zagon is a left tributary of the river Covasna in Romania. It flows into the Covasna in Boroșneu Mare.

References

Rivers of Romania
Rivers of Covasna County